The Foreign Office Collection is a collection of proofs, colour trials, and issued stamps from the Allied Military Administration issues of 1945–48 for occupied Germany. The collection forms part of the British Library Philatelic Collections. It was transferred from the Foreign Office in 1956.

See also 
Model Collection
Postage stamps and postal history of Germany

References 

British Library Philatelic Collections
Philately of Germany